Stanley Kenneth Sperry (February 19, 1914 – September 27, 1962) was a second baseman in Major League Baseball. He played for the Philadelphia Phillies and Philadelphia Athletics.

References

External links

1914 births
1962 deaths
Major League Baseball second basemen
Philadelphia Phillies players
Philadelphia Athletics players
Baseball players from Wisconsin
People from Evansville, Wisconsin